Swetha (born 30 April 1990), professionally known as Nandita Swetha, is an Indian actress, model, dancer and media personality who predominantly appears in Tamil and Telugu language films. Swetha also starred in the Kannada film industry with the 2008 film Nanda Loves Nanditha. Later she made her acting debut in Tamil 2012 comedy film Attakathi. She made her Telugu debut 2016 horror Comedy film Ekkadiki Pothavu Chinnavada.

Career

Swetha began her career as an VJ in Udaya Music while studying in school. She began her acting career in the 2008 Kannada film Nanda Loves Nanditha. Her character in the film was named Nandita, which she later adopted as her screen name. In 2012 her first Tamil film was Attakathi directed by Pa. Ranjith. Her performances were appreciated. She went on to star as an athlete in Ethir Neechal (2013) directed by Durai Senthilkumar. She appeared in the comedy Idharkuthane Aasaipattai Balakumara (2013) as chennai girl Kumudha with Vijay Sethupathi.

In 2014, her films Mundaasupatti, Nalanum Nandhiniyum and Aindhaam Thalaimurai Sidha Vaidhiya Sigamani were released. In 2015, Uppu Karuvaadu and Puli were released. In 2016 Anjala, Ekkadiki Pothavu Chinnavada were her releases. She won the Filmfare Award for Best Supporting Actress – Telugu. In December 2017 her film Ulkuthu released. In Kalakalappu 2 (2018), she appears as Guest appearance. Her next release was Kaathiruppor Pattiyal (2018) and Asuravadham (2018). And two Telugu movies, 
Srinivasa Kalyanam (2018) and Bluff Master (2018). In 2019, she starred in horror comedies with Prema Katha Chitram 2, Devi 2, Abhinetri 2 followed by thrillers 7 and Kalki. In 2020, she also appeared in Taana was an below average critics.

Personal life
She hails from Bangalore, Karnataka, where her father is a businessman and her mother a homemaker. She has two younger brothers.

Filmography

Other works

Singing 

Television

2021 - Abhiyum Naanum - Sun TV - special appearance

Dubbing artist

Awards

References

External links

 

Indian film actresses
Actresses in Tamil cinema
Actresses in Kannada cinema
Actresses from Bangalore
Living people
Actresses in Telugu cinema
21st-century Indian actresses
1990 births